Junkin' with Val and Dave was a television show which aired on the Turner South cable network.  The program was Turner South's highest rated original production.

The show followed hosts Val Myers and Dave Bird (who was also the show's creator and executive producer) as they traveled throughout the Southeast visiting flea markets and yard sales, each episode based in a different city.  During a typical program, Val and Dave chatted with sellers and bought merchandise they found interesting, then sold the items on eBay and donated the money to charity. Auction results were broadcast in subsequent episodes.

Awards
During its four seasons in production, the series won two Southeast Regional Emmy Awards:
 2004: Outstanding Achievement: Television Programming Excellence, Entertainment Program (for episode #113, "Foley, Alabama")
 2006: Outstanding Achievement: Television Special Achievement Excellence, Interactivity

References

External links
 

2003 American television series debuts
2006 American television series endings